Joris en de Draak (English: George and the Dragon) is a wooden racing coaster in the theme park Efteling, based on the legend of Saint George.

History and details

The dual-tracked roller coaster, built in the place of the 2009 demolished wooden coaster Pegasus, features two tracks, named 'Water' and 'Fire' respectively. A total of five Millennium Flyer trains with 12 cars each are used, although only four trains are used at once for maintenance purposes. Riders are arranged two across in a single row for a total of 24 riders per train, totaling a capacity of 1750 riders per hour.

The attraction's theming, including a  fire-breathing animatronic dragon, was designed by P&P Projects.

Awards
Joris en de Draak was ranked in the Amusement Today's Golden Ticket Awards for best new ride of 2010 with 4% of the vote, to come in fifth place.

References

External links 
 Official ride website

Roller coasters introduced in 2010
Efteling
Roller coasters in the Netherlands
Saint George and the Dragon
2010 establishments in the Netherlands
21st-century architecture in the Netherlands